Tommaso Acquaviva d'Aragona, O.P. (1600 – 23 August 1672) was a Roman Catholic prelate who served as Bishop of Bitonto (1668–1672).

Biography
Tommaso Acquaviva d'Aragona was born in Nardo, Italy in 1600 and ordained a priest in the Order of Preachers. On 14 May 1668, he was appointed during the papacy of Pope Clement IX as Bishop of Bitonto. On 21 May 1668, he was consecrated bishop by Francesco Maria Brancaccio, Cardinal-Bishop of Frascati, with Stefano Brancaccio, Titular Archbishop of Hadrianopolis in Haemimonto, and Giuseppe della Corgna,  Bishop of Orvieto, serving as co-consecrators. He served as Bishop of Bitonto until his death on 23 August 1672.

References

External links and additional sources
 (for Chronology of Bishops)
 (for Chronology of Bishops)

17th-century Italian Roman Catholic bishops
Bishops appointed by Pope Clement IX
1600 births
1672 deaths
Bishops of Bitonto